Viktor Shapovalov (born 4 March 1965 in Sterlitamak, Bashkir ASSR) is a Russian auto racing driver. Most of his career has been in touring cars, competing in the Russian Touring Car Championship as well as the Dutch Supercar Challenge. In 1998 he won the 1600 Class Russian Touring Car Cup with a Lada Samara.

In 2007 he first competed in the World Touring Car Championship for his own Russian Bears Motorsport team in a BMW 320i. The team entered just four rounds at Zandvoort and Valencia, with little success. He returned for the 2008 season with the surprising entry of a Lada 110, competing in fourteen rounds. His best finish this year was an eighteenth place at Brno. For the 2009 season he returned with full manufacturer backing from Lada. Halfway through the 2009 season Shapovalov retired from driving duties to concentrate on running the LADA Sport operation as they run James Thompson in the new Lada Priora model.

Racing record

Complete WTCC results
(key) (Races in bold indicate pole position) (Races in italics indicate fastest lap)

 * Season still in progress.

References

1965 births
Living people
Moscow Aviation Institute alumni
People from Sterlitamak
Russian racing drivers
World Touring Car Championship drivers
Sports car racing team owners
Sportspeople from Bashkortostan